Nicholas Alexander Blackman (born 11 November 1989) is a professional footballer who plays as a striker for the Barbados national football team. He can also play as a winger. He last played for Maccabi Tel Aviv.

Early life

Blackman was born in Salford, Greater Manchester, to a Jewish mother from England and a Christian father from Barbados. His Polish-Jewish maternal grandfather Benjamin Rosenfeld was an Auschwitz/Holocaust survivor and his Dutch-Jewish maternal grandmother Marta. He had a Bar Mitzvah.

Blackman attended Manchester United Academies for five years from the age of eight, and also spent time at Bury and Preston North End academies. He attended King David High School followed by Phillips High School in Manchester.

At the age of 13 Blackman competed in the 2005 Maccabiah Games in Israel as part of a British schools football team.

Club career

Macclesfield Town
Blackman was signed by Macclesfield Town in Summer 2006. After a string of impressive displays for the youth team Blackman signed his first professional contract at Macclesfield on 8 March 2007. After making his league debut against Accrington Stanley his hopes of regular first team football were dashed by a pre-season injury that kept him out of action for several months.

Blackman scored his debut goal for Macclesfield in a 1–1 home draw with Dagenham & Redbridge on 23 November 2007, when after coming on as a substitute, Blackman scored in the 90th minute. Blackman made a total of 12 appearances for Macclesfield, mostly as a substitute, scoring one goal.

Blackburn Rovers
Blackman joined Premier League club Blackburn Rovers on 12 January 2009, after impressing in a trial, for an undisclosed fee on a two-and-a-half-year contract. Blackman scored two goals in his first two games for the club's reserve team.

Blackpool (loan)
On 3 March, Blackman joined Championship club Blackpool on loan initially for one month. Blackman made his debut later that same day as a 65th-minute substitute in a 0–1 home loss to Burnley at Bloomfield Road. After two substitution appearances, Blackman scored on his full debut, a 2–2 draw with Sheffield United at Bramall Lane on 10 March.

Oldham (loan)
On 20 August 2009, Blackman joined Oldham Athletic on a month's loan. Two days later, Blackman made his Latics debut in a 2–2 draw versus Swindon Town, playing the full 90 minutes. His first goal for the club came on 29 August when Blackman curled a shot into the net from the edge of the area for Oldham's only goal in a 1–1 draw against Brentford. His loan period was extended until January 2010 after which Blackman returned to Blackburn.

Motherwell and Aberdeen (loan)
Blackman joined Scottish Premier League club Motherwell on a six-month loan on 13 August 2010 and scored 10 goals in 18 games in total which, included a hat trick in a 4–0 win over St Johnstone in November 2010. On 13 January 2011, former Motherwell manager Craig Brown signed Blackman for Aberdeen on loan for six-months.

Return to Blackburn Rovers
Blackman returned to Blackburn Rovers at the end of his loan spell. During the Premier League Asia Trophy match against Kitchee of Hong Kong, Blackman came off the bench for Blackburn Rovers winning and converting a penalty in a 3–0 win.

Sheffield United
Blackman signed for Sheffield United, on 10 August 2012, a two-year-deal for an undisclosed fee reported to be £115,000 plus a 20% sell on after turning down offers from Championship clubs. Blackman scored his first goal for the Blades with his first touch in a League Cup game against Burton Albion at Bramall Lane on 11 August 2012. Blackman played regularly for the Blades throughout the first half of the season, making 33 appearances and scoring 14 goals by the end of January. By this time however Blackman was attracting interest from other clubs and was the subject of bids from both Crystal Palace and Reading and despite United accepting offers from both clubs, Blackman rejected a move to Palace.

Reading
On 30 January 2013, Blackman signed for Premier League side Reading for an undisclosed fee, reported to be around £1.35m and a 20% sell on. He signed on a three-and-a-half-year contract. Blackman made his debut on 2 February, replacing Pavel Pogrebnyak in the 72nd minute of a 2–1 win against Sunderland. Blackman scored the first Reading goal of the 2015–2016 Championship season in a 2–1 away defeat to Birmingham.

Derby County
On 6 January 2016, it was announced that Blackman had signed a three-and-a-half-year deal with Derby County for a reported fee of over £3 million. He scored his only goal for the club, a penalty, in a 2–0 win over Cardiff City on 27 September 2016.

Maccabi Tel Aviv loan
After starting only 12 matches for Derby, Blackman joined Israeli Premier League club Maccabi Tel Aviv on a season-long loan in August 2017. He scored 10 goals in 31 Israeli Premier League games. On 22 May 2018 Blackman returned to Derby County after the end of his loan spell.

Sporting de Gijón loan
On 15 August 2018, Blackman joined Sporting de Gijón on a season-long loan. In January 2019 he scored the winner in the last 16 of the Copa del Rey against Valencia.

Maccabi Tel Aviv
After being released by Derby County in July 2019, Blackman signed a two-year contract with Maccabi Tel Aviv on 17 July 2019.

In his first season back at the club, Blackman won the Israeli Premier League title. Despite some favourable displays in the early part of the season, Blackman spent large amounts of time away from the first team due to injury.

2020–21 season
Blackman scored both goals for Maccabi in the first leg of their victory against Hapoel Be'er Sheva in the Israel Super Cup on 8 August 2020. On 19 August, Blackman again scored twice in a 2–0 victory over Riga FC in the first qualifying round of the 2020–21 UEFA Champions League. Seven days later, Blackman continued his good form, scoring in Maccabi's successful second qualifying round win over FK Sūduva of Lithuania in the same competition.

International career
According to Blackman, he was eligible to represent England, Barbados, the Netherlands, Poland or Israel at international level—Barbados through his father, the Netherlands and Poland through his maternal grandparents, and Israel through "family members". In 2019, Blackman decided to represent Barbados at international level.

Career statistics

Club

International

International goals
Scores and results list Barbados' goal tally first.

Honours
Maccabi Tel Aviv
Israeli Premier League: 2019–20
Toto Cup: 2017–18, 2020–21
Israel Super Cup: 2020

See also
List of select Jewish football (association; soccer) players

References

External links

Nick Blackman profile at Reading F.C.

Twitter page

Living people
1989 births
People from Whitefield, Greater Manchester
People with acquired Barbadian citizenship
Barbadian footballers
Barbados international footballers
English footballers
Black British sportsmen
Jewish footballers
English Ashkenazi Jews
Association football forwards
Macclesfield Town F.C. players
Blackburn Rovers F.C. players
Blackpool F.C. players
Oldham Athletic A.F.C. players
Motherwell F.C. players
Aberdeen F.C. players
Sheffield United F.C. players
Reading F.C. players
Derby County F.C. players
Maccabi Tel Aviv F.C. players
Sporting de Gijón players
Premier League players
English Football League players
Scottish Premier League players
Israeli Premier League players
Maccabiah Games competitors for Great Britain
Maccabiah Games footballers
British emigrants to Israel
Competitors at the 2005 Maccabiah Games
Barbadian expatriate footballers
English sportspeople of Barbadian descent
Footballers from Salford
Barbadian Jews
English Jews
English expatriate sportspeople in Spain
Expatriate footballers in Spain
Expatriate footballers in Israel
English expatriate sportspeople in Israel
Barbadian expatriate sportspeople in Israel
Barbadian expatriate sportspeople in Spain
Segunda División players